Films made in the 1980s featuring the character of James Bond included For Your Eyes Only, Octopussy, Never Say Never Again, A View to a Kill, The Living Daylights, and Licence to Kill. The decade featured 3 Bond actors Roger Moore, Sean Connery and Timothy Dalton. The 1980s were unique for the Eon franchise in that every Bond film of the decade was directed by one director John Glen. The 1980s also saw the rare occurrence of a Bond film being released by a company other than Eon. 1983's Never Say Never Again saw Connery return to the role one final time.

For Your Eyes Only

Production of For Your Eyes Only begun on 2 September 1980 in the North Sea, with three days shooting exterior scenes with the St Georges. The interiors were shot later in Pinewood Studios, as well as the ship's explosion, which was done with a miniature in Pinewood's tank on the 007 Stage. On 15 September principal photography started in Corfu at the Villa Sylva at Kanoni, above Corfu Town, which acted as the location of the Spanish villa. Many of the local houses were painted white for scenographic reasons. Glen opted to use the local slopes and olive trees for the chase scene between Melina's Citroën 2CV and Gonzales' men driving Peugeot 504s. The scene was shot across twelve days, with stunt driver Rémy Julienne – who would remain in the series up until GoldenEye – driving the Citroën. Four 2CVs were used, with modifications for the stunts – all had more powerful flat-four engines, and one received a special revolving plate on its roof so it could get turned upside down.

In October filming moved to other Greek locations, including Meteora and the Achilleion. In November, the main unit moved to England, which included interior work in Pinewood, while the second unit shot underwater scenes in The Bahamas. On 1 January 1981, production moved to Cortina D'Ampezzo in Italy, where filming wrapped on February. Since it was not snowing in Cortina D'Ampezzo by the time of filming, the producers had to pay for trucks to bring snow from nearby mountains, which was then dumped in the city's streets.

Many of the underwater scenes, especially involving close-ups of Bond and Melina, were actually faked on a dry soundstage. A combination of lighting effects, slow-motion photography, wind, and bubbles added in post-production, gave the illusion of the actors being underwater. Actress Carole Bouquet reportedly had a pre-existing health condition that prevented her from performing actual underwater stunt work. Actual aquatic scenes were done by a team led by Al Giddings, who had previously worked in The Deep, and filmed in either Pinewood's tank on the 007 Stage or an underwater set built in the Bahamas. Production designer Peter Lamont and his team developed two working props for the submarine Neptune, as well as a mock-up with a fake bottom.

Roger Moore was reluctant to film the scene of Bond kicking a car, with Locque inside, over the edge of a cliff, saying that it "was Bond-like, but not Roger Moore Bond-like." Michael G. Wilson later said that Moore had to be persuaded to be more ruthless than he felt comfortable. Wilson also added that he and Richard Maibaum, along with John Glen, toyed with other ideas surrounding that scene, but ultimately everyone, even Moore, agreed to do the scene as originally written.

For the Meteora shoots, a Greek bishop was paid to allow filming in the monasteries, but the uninformed Eastern Orthodox monks were mostly critical of production rolling in their installations. After a trial in the Greek Supreme Court, it was decided that the monks' only property were the interiors – the exteriors and surrounding landscapes were from the local government. In protest, the monks remained shut inside the monasteries during the shooting, and tried to sabotage production as much as possible, hanging their washing out of their windows and covering the principal monastery with plastic bunting and flags to spoil the shots, and placing oil drums to prevent the film crew from landing helicopters. The production team solved the problem with back lighting, matte paintings, and building both a similar scenographic monastery on a nearby unoccupied rock, and a monastery set in Pinewood.

Roger Moore said he had a great fear of heights, and to do the climbing in Greece, he resorted to moderate drinking to calm his nerves. Later in that same sequence, Rick Sylvester, a stuntman who had previously performed the pre-credits ski jump in The Spy Who Loved Me, undertook the stunt of Bond falling off the side of the cliff. The stunt was dangerous, since the sudden stop at the bottom could be fatal. Special effects supervisor Derek Meddings developed a system that would dampen the stop, but Sylvester recalled that his nerves nearly got the better of him: "From where we were [shooting], you could see the local cemetery; and the box [to stop my fall] looked like a casket. You didn't need to be an English major to connect the dots." The stunt went off without a problem.

Bond veteran cameraman and professional skier Willy Bogner, Jr. was promoted to director of a second unit involving ski footage. Bogner designed the ski chase on the bobsleigh track of Cortina d'Ampezzo hoping to surpass his work in both On Her Majesty's Secret Service and The Spy Who Loved Me. To allow better filming, Bogner developed both a system where he was attached to a bobsleigh, allowing to film the vehicle or behind it, and a set of skis that allowed him to ski forwards and backwards in order to get the best shots. In February 1981, on the final day of filming the bobsleigh chase, one of the stuntmen driving a sleigh, 23-year-old Paolo Rigon, was killed when he became trapped under the bob.

The pre-credits sequence used a church in Stoke Poges as a cemetery, while the helicopter scenes were filmed at the abandoned Beckton Gas Works in London. The gas works were also the location for some of Stanley Kubrick's 1987 film, Full Metal Jacket. Director John Glen got the idea for the remote-controlled helicopter after seeing a child playing with an RC car. Since flying the helicopter through a warehouse was too dangerous, the scene where the vehicle enters was done through forced perspective – stunt pilot Marc Wolff drove besides the building, making it seem as if the helicopter was entering a smaller mock-up built by Derek Meddings' team which was closer to the camera – while the footage inside the building was shot on location, though with a life-sized helicopter model which stood over a rail. Stuntman Martin Grace stood as Bond when the agent is dangling outside the flying helicopter, while Roger Moore himself was used in the scenes inside the model.

Octopussy

The filming of Octopussy began on 10 August 1982 with the scene in which Bond arrives at Checkpoint Charlie. Principal photography was done by Arthur Wooster and his second unit, who later filmed the knife-throwing scenes. Much of the film was shot in Udaipur, India. The Monsoon Palace served as the exterior of Kamal Khan's palace, while scenes set at Octopussy's palace were filmed at the Lake Palace and Jag Mandir, and Bond's hotel was the Shiv Niwas Palace. In England RAF Northolt, RAF Upper Heyford and RAF Oakley were the main locations. The Karl-Marx-Stadt railways scenes were shot at the Nene Valley Railway, near Peterborough, while studio work was performed at the Pinewood Studios and 007 Stage. Most of the crew as well as Roger Moore had diet problems while shooting in India.

The pre-title sequence has a scene where Bond flies a nimble homebuilt Bede BD-5J aircraft through an open hangar. Hollywood stunt pilot and aerial coordinator J.W. "Corkey" Fornoff, who piloted the aircraft at more than 150 miles per hour, has said, "Today, few directors would consider such a stunt. They'd just whip it up in a computer lab." Having collapsible wings, the plane was shown hidden in a horse trailer; however, a dummy was used for this shot. Filming inside the hangar was achieved by attaching the aircraft to an old Jaguar car by a steel pole with the roof removed and driving along. The second unit were able to add enough obstacles including people and objects inside the hangar to hide the car and the pole and make it look as though Moore was flying inside the base. For the explosion after the mini jet escapes, however, a miniature of the hangar was constructed and filmed up close. The exploding pieces of the hangar were in reality only four inches in length. A Mercedes-Benz saloon car was stolen by Bond and used to chase the train – having had his tyres shot out, Bond drove on the rails and entered the train. During filming, the car had intact tyres in one scene so as to avoid any mishap.

Stunt co-ordinator Martin Grace suffered an injury while shooting the scene where Bond climbs down the train to catch Octopussy's attention. During the second day of filming, Grace – who was Roger Moore's stunt double for the scene – carried on doing the scene longer than he should have, due to a miscommunication with the second unit director, and the train entered a section of the track that the team had not properly surveyed. Shortly afterwards, a concrete pole fractured Grace's left leg. This affected morale in the camp for some time.

The bicyclist seen passing in the middle of a sword fight during the tuk tuk chase sequence was in fact a bystander who passed through the shot, oblivious to the filming; his intrusion was captured by two cameras and left in the final film as an unscheduled stunt. Cameraman Alan Hume's last scene was that of Octopussy's followers rowing. That day, little time was left and it was decided to film the sunset at the eleventh hour when Hume said, "Oh, just shoot the bloody thing!"

The Fabergé egg in the film is real; it was made in 1897 and is called the Coronation Egg, although the egg in the film is named in the auction catalogue as "Property of a Lady", which is the name of one of Ian Fleming's short stories released in more recent editions of the collection Octopussy and The Living Daylights.

In a bit of diegesis that "breaks the fourth wall", Vijay signals his affiliation to MI6 by playing the James Bond Theme on a recorder while Bond is disembarking from a boat in the harbour near the City Palace. Like his fictional counterpart, the real Vijay had a distinct fear of snakes and found difficulty holding the basket during filming.

Never Say Never Again
The film is based on the James Bond novel Thunderball, which had been previously adapted in a 1965 film under that name. Unlike the majority of Bond films, Never Say Never Again was not produced by Eon Productions, but by Jack Schwartzman's Taliafilm in association with Kevin McClory, one of the original writers of the Thunderball storyline with Ian Fleming and Jack Whittingham. McClory retained the filming rights of the novel following a long legal battle dating from the 1960s with a settlement allowing McClory to be contractually able to create his own version of the Thunderball story after 10 years had passed.

Connery played the role of James Bond for the seventh and final time, marking his return to the character 12 years after Diamonds Are Forever. The film's title is a reference to Connery's reported declaration in 1971 that he would "never again" play that role. As Connery was 52 at the time of filming, although nearly three years younger than incumbent Bond Roger Moore, the storyline features an aging Bond, who is brought back into action to investigate the theft of two nuclear weapons by SPECTRE. Filming locations included France, Spain, the Bahamas and Elstree Studios in England. Due to the unique nature of 2 competing Bond films being released in the same year, the media dubbed the circumstance "The Battle of the Bonds".

This film is currently the final Non-Eon Bond film to be released. As Eon have now secured the rights to every Bond story including Thunderball and Casino Royale; it is highly unlikely any future Non-Eon Bond films could ever be released in the foreseeable future.

A View to a Kill
The film was shot at Pinewood Studios in London, Iceland, Switzerland, France and the United States.
Several French landmarks such as the Eiffel Tower, its Jules Verne Restaurant and the Château de Chantilly were filmed.
The rest of the major filming was done in the Fisherman's Wharf and the Golden Gate Bridge in San Francisco. The Lefty O'Doul Bridge was featured in the fire engine chase scene. The horse racing scenes were shot at Ascot Racecourse.

The production of the film began on 23 June 1984 in Iceland, where the second unit filmed the pre-title sequence. On 27 June 1984, several leftover canisters of petrol used during filming of Ridley Scott's Legend caused Pinewood Studios' "007 Stage" to burn to the ground. The stage was rebuilt, and reopened in January 1985 (renamed as "Albert R. Broccoli's 007 Stage") for filming on A View to a Kill. Work had continued on other stages at Pinewood when Roger Moore rejoined the main unit there on 1 August 1984. The crew then departed for shooting the horse-racing scenes at Royal Ascot Racecourse. The scene in which Bond and Sutton enter the mineshaft was then filmed in a waterlogged quarry near Staines and the Amberley Chalk Pits Museum in West Sussex.

On 6 October 1984, the fourth unit, headed by the special effects supervisor John Richardson, began its work on the climactic fight sequence. At first, only a few plates constructed to resemble the Golden Gate Bridge were used. Later that night, the shooting of the burning San Francisco City Hall commenced. The first actual scenes atop the bridge were filmed on 7 October 1984.

In Paris it was planned that two stunt men, B.J. Worth and Don Caldvedt, would help film two takes of a parachute drop off a (clearly visible) platform that extended from a top edge of the Eiffel Tower. However, sufficient footage was obtained from Worth's jump, so Caldvedt was told he would not be performing his own jump. Caldvedt, unhappy at not being able to perform the jump, parachuted off the tower without authorisation from the City of Paris. He was subsequently sacked by the production team for jeopardising the continuation of filming in the city.

Airship Industries managed a major marketing coup with the inclusion of their Skyship 500 series airship in the film. At the time Airship Industries were producing a fleet of ships which were recognisable over many capitals of the world offering tours, or advertising sponsorship deals. As all Bond films have included the most current technology, this included the lighter than air interest.

The ship used in the climax was a Skyship 500, then on a promotional tour of Los Angeles after its participation in the opening ceremony of the 1984 Olympic Games. At that time, it had "WELCOME" painted across the side of the hull, but the word was replaced by "ZORIN INDUSTRIES" for the film. During the 1984 season, the ship was painted green and red as a part of Fujifilm's blimp fleet; it was subsequently coloured white. In real life, inflating it would take up to 24 hours, but during the film it was shown to take two minutes.

The Living Daylights
The film was shot at the Pinewood Studios at its 007 Stage in UK, as well as Weissensee in Austria. The pre-title sequence was filmed on the Rock of Gibraltar and although the sequence shows a hijacked Land Rover careering down various sections of road over several minutes before bursting through a wall and towards the sea, the location mostly used the same short stretch of road, at the very top of the Rock, shot from numerous different angles. The beach defences seen at the foot of the Rock in the initial shot were also added solely for the film, to an otherwise non-military area. The action involving the Land Rover switched from Gibraltar, to Beachy Head in the UK for the shot showing the vehicle actually getting airborne. Trial runs of the stunt with the Land Rover, during which Bond escapes by parachute from the tumbling vehicle, were filmed in the Mojave Desert, although the final cut of the film uses a shot achieved using a dummy. Other locations included Germany, the United States, and Italy. The desert scenes were done in Ouarzazate, Morocco. The conclusion of the film included the Schönbrunn Palace, Vienna and Elveden Hall, Suffolk.

Principal photography commenced at Gibraltar on 17 September 1986. Aerial stuntmen B.J. Worth and Jake Lombard performed to the pre-credits parachute jump. Both the terrain and wind were unfavourable. Consideration was given to the stunt being done using cranes but aerial stunts arranger B.J. Worth stuck to skydiving and completed the scenes in a day. The aircraft used for the jump was a C-130 Hercules, which in the film had M's office installed in the aircraft cabin. The initial point of view for the scene shows M in what appears to be his usual London office, but the camera then zooms out to reveal that it is, in fact, inside an aircraft. Although marked as a Royal Air Force aircraft, the one in shot belonged to the Spanish Air Force and was used again later in the film for the Afghanistan sequences this time in "Russian" markings. During this later chapter, a fight breaks out on the open ramp of the aircraft in flight between Bond and Necros, before Necros falls to his death. Although the plot and preceding shots suggest the aircraft is a C-130, the shot of Necros falling away from the aircraft show a twin engine cargo plane, a C-123 Provider. Worth and Lombard also doubled for Bond and Necros in the scenes where they are hanging on a bag in a plane's open cargo door.

The press would not meet Dalton and d'Abo until 5 October 1986, when the main unit travelled to Vienna. Almost two weeks after the second unit filming on Gibraltar, the first unit started shooting with Andreas Wisniewski and stunt man Bill Weston. During the course of these three days it took to film this fight Weston fractured a finger, and Wisniewski knocked him out once. The next day finds the crew on location at Stonor House doubling for Bladen's Safe House, the first scene Jeroen Krabbé filmed.

The return of Aston Martin

The film reunites Bond with British car maker Aston Martin. Following Bond's use of the Aston Martin DBS in On Her Majesty's Secret Service, the filmmakers then turned to the brand new Lotus Esprit in 1977s The Spy Who Loved Me, which reappeared four years later in For Your Eyes Only. Despite the iconic status of the submersible Lotus however, Bond's Aston Martin DB5 is recognised as the most famous of his vehicles. As a consequence, Aston Martin returned with their V8 Vantage.

Two different Aston Martin models were used in filming - a V8 Volante convertible, and later for the Czechoslovakia scenes, a hard-top non-Volante V8 saloon badged to look like the Volante.  The Volante was a production model owned by Aston Martin Lagonda chairman, Victor Gauntlett.

Licence to Kill
Principal photography ran from 18 July to 18 November 1988. Shooting began in Mexico, which mostly doubled for the fictional Republic of Isthmus: locations in Mexico City included the Biblioteca del Banco de Mexico for the exterior of El Presidente Hotel and the Casino Español for the interior of Casino de Isthmus whilst the Teatro de la Ciudad was used for its exterior. Villa Arabesque in Acapulco was used for Sanchez's lavish villa, and the La Rumorosa Mountain Pass in Mexicali was used as the filming site for the tanker chase during the climax of the film. Sanchez's Olympiatec Meditation Institute was shot at the Otomi Ceremonial Center in Temoaya. Other underwater sequences were shot at the Isla Mujeres near Cancún.

In August 1988, production moved to the Florida Keys, notably Key West. Seven Mile Bridge towards Pigeon Key was used for the sequence in which the armoured truck transporting Sanchez following his arrest is driven off the edge. Other locations there included Ernest Hemingway House, Key West International Airport, Mallory Square, St. Mary's Star of the Sea Church for Leiter's wedding and Stephano's House 707 South Street for his house and patio. The US Coast Guard Pier was used to film Isthmus City harbour. As production moved back to Mexico, Broccoli became ill, leading to Michael G. Wilson becoming co-producer, a position he subsequently retained.

The scene where Sanchez's plane is hijacked was filmed on location in Florida, with stuntman Jake Lombard jumping from a helicopter to a plane, but Timothy Dalton himself being filmed atop the aircraft. The plane towed by the helicopter was a life-sized model created by special effects supervisor John Richardson. After filming wide shots of David Hedison and Dalton parachuting, closer shots were done near the church location. During one of the takes, a malfunction of the harness equipment caused Hedison to fall on the sidewalk. The injury made him limp for the remainder of filming. The aquatic battle between Bond and henchmen had two separate units, a surface one led by Arthur Woolster which used Dalton himself, and an underwater one which involved experienced divers. The barefoot waterskiing was done by world champion Dave Reinhart, with some close-ups using Dalton on a special rig. Milton Krest's death used a prostethic head which was created by John Richardson's team based on a mold of Anthony Zerbe's face. The result was so gruesome and realistic it had to be shortened and toned down to avoid censorship problems.

For the climactic tanker chase, the producers used an entire section of a highway near Mexicali, which had been closed for safety reasons. Sixteen eighteen-wheeler tankers were used, some with modifications made by manufacturer Kenworth at the request of driving stunts arranger Rémy Julienne. Most were given improvements to their engines to run faster, while one model had an extra steering wheel on the back of the cabin so a hidden stuntman could drive while Carey Lowell was in the front and another received extra suspension on its back so it could lift its front wheels. Although a rig was constructed to help a rig tilt onto its side, it was not necessary as Julienne was able to pull off the stunt without the aid of camera trickery.

Reception table

References

James Bond in film
1980s in film
1980s in British cinema